The 2014 Major League Baseball All-Star Game was the 85th edition of the Major League Baseball All-Star Game, held at Target Field in Minneapolis, Minnesota, the home of the Minnesota Twins. This was the third All-Star Game played in the Twin Cities; Metropolitan Stadium hosted the game in 1965, while the Hubert H. Humphrey Metrodome hosted the game in 1985. It was televised in the United States on Fox as part of a new eight-year deal. In preparation for the game the Twin Cities' transit company, MetroTransit, completed the new METRO Green Line light-rail between downtown Minneapolis and downtown Saint Paul, and began service on June 14, 2014.

Host selection
The Chicago Cubs were the only other team that made a bid for hosting the 2014 All-Star Game. Typically the leagues alternate hosts every year, except for 2005, 2007, 2015, and 2016, which were hosted by the Pittsburgh Pirates, San Francisco Giants, Cincinnati Reds and San Diego Padres, respectively. With 2014 being the American League's turn, Chicago made a bid hoping an exception would be made for the National League Cubs in order to honor the centennial of Wrigley Field (which last hosted an All-Star Game in 1990).

Fan balloting

Starters
Balloting for the 2014 All-Star Game starters began online April 23 and ended on July 2. The top vote-getters at each position (including the designated hitter for the American League) and the top three among outfielders, were named the starters for their respective leagues. The results were announced on July 6.

Final roster spot
After the rosters were finalized, a second ballot of five players per league was created for the All-Star Final Vote to determine the 34th and final player of each roster. The online balloting was conducted from July 5 through July 9.

Rosters
Players in italics have since been inducted into the National Baseball Hall of Fame.

American League

National League

Salvador Perez was named starter in place of Matt Wieters due to injury.
Kurt Suzuki was named as the roster replacement for Wieters.
Jeff Samardzija was elected as a member of the Cubs, but was traded to the Athletics on July 4.
Kyle Seager was named as a replacement for Edwin Encarnación due to injury.
Koji Uehara was named as a replacement for Masahiro Tanaka due to injury.
Erick Aybar was named as a replacement for Alex Gordon due to injury.
Miguel Montero was named as a replacement for Yadier Molina due to injury.
Jonathan Lucroy was named starter in place of Yadier Molina due to injury.
Ian Kinsler was named as a replacement for Víctor Martínez due to injury.
Henderson Alvarez was named as a replacement for Jordan Zimmermann due to injury.
Fernando Rodney was named as a replacement for David Price due to Price starting on Sunday.
Alfredo Simon was named as a replacement for Johnny Cueto due to Cueto starting on Sunday.
Tim Hudson was named as a replacement for Madison Bumgarner due to Bumgarner starting on Sunday.
Tyler Clippard was named as a replacement for Julio Teheran due to Teheran starting on Sunday.
Huston Street was named as a replacement for Tyson Ross due to Ross starting on Sunday.
Julio Teheran was named as a replacement for Jeff Samardzija due to him being traded to the Oakland Athletics.
#: Indicates player would not play (replaced as per reference notes above).

Game summary

Starting lineup

The American League took a 3–0 lead in the first inning on a Derek Jeter double, a Mike Trout triple and a Miguel Cabrera home run. The NL scored two runs in the second with three consecutive hits by Aramis Ramírez, Chase Utley and Jonathan Lucroy against Jon Lester. Lucroy tied the game at three in the fourth with another RBI double. The American League took a 5–3 lead in the 5th on a Trout double and a José Altuve sacrifice fly. The lead held up and the AL won by the score of 5–3.  The host team's battery -- Minnesota Twins closer Glen Perkins and catcher Kurt Suzuki -- took the field for the top of the ninth and Perkins earned the save.

Box score

See also

List of Major League Baseball All-Star Game winners
All-Star Futures Game
Home Run Derby

References

External links

Official website of the All-Star Game
2014 Major League Baseball All-Star Game at ESPN

Major League Baseball All-Star Game
Major League Baseball Allstar Game
Baseball competitions in Minneapolis
Major League Baseball All Star Game
2010s in Minneapolis
Major League Baseball All Star Game